The Glen Rock Public Schools is a comprehensive community public school district that serves students in kindergarten through twelfth grade from Glen Rock, in Bergen County, New Jersey, United States.

As of the 2019–20 school year, the district, comprised of six schools, had an enrollment of 2,567 students and 224.9 classroom teachers (on an FTE basis), for a student–teacher ratio of 11.4:1.

The district is classified by the New Jersey Department of Education as being in District Factor Group "J", the highest of eight groupings. District Factor Groups organize districts statewide to allow comparison by common socioeconomic characteristics of the local districts. From lowest socioeconomic status to highest, the categories are A, B, CD, DE, FG, GH, I and J.

Awards and recognition
The district's high school was one of 18 schools statewide (and three public high schools) honored in 2018 by the National Blue Ribbon Schools Program by the United States Department of Education.

The high school was the 4th-ranked public high school in New Jersey out of 328 schools statewide in New Jersey Monthly magazine's September 2012 cover story on the state's "Top Public High Schools", after being ranked 28th in 2010 out of 322 schools listed. In 2012, Newsweek ranked the school 30th in the state; in the Glen Rock High School graduating class of 2012, 98% of students indicated that they would move on to a two-year or four-year college.

Schools 

Schools in the district (with 2019–20 enrollment data from the National Center for Education Statistics) are: 
Elementary schools
Richard E. Byrd School with 272 students in grades K–5
Jodie Craft, Principal
Central Elementary School with 345 students in grades K–5
Krista LaCroix, Principal
Clara E. Coleman School with 318 students in grades K–5
Edward Thompson, Principal
Alexander Hamilton Elementary School with 279 students in grades K–5
Irene Pierides, Principal
Middle school
Glen Rock Middle School with 601 students in grades 6–8
Michael Parent, Principal
Michael Escalante, Vice Principal
High school
Glen Rock High School with 715 students in grades 9–12
Michael Parent, Principal
Tina Bacolas, Vice Principal

The high school underwent a $45.3 million renovation project that started in 2009 and was completed for the 2011-12 school year, which included a new science wing, a creative arts department and system updates.

Administration
Core members of the district's administration are:
Dr. Brett Charleston, Superintendent of Schools
Michael Rinderknecht, Business Administrator / Board Secretary

Board of education
The district's board of education, comprised of nine members, sets policy and oversees the fiscal and educational operation of the district through its administration. As a Type II school district, the board's trustees are elected directly by voters to serve three-year terms of office on a staggered basis, with three seats up for election each year held (since 2012) as part of the November general election. The board appoints a superintendent to oversee the district's day-to-day operations and a business administrator to supervise the business functions of the district.

References

External links 
Glen Rock Public Schools

Glen Rock Public Schools, National Center for Education Statistics

Glen Rock, New Jersey
School districts in Bergen County, New Jersey
New Jersey District Factor Group J